Håkon Rege (born 30 September 1955) is a Norwegian politician for the Progress and Conservative parties.

Rege was originally a member of the Progress Party, and became the party's first mayor in 1988, of the municipality Sola. In 1995 he however had "had enough of the party", and resigned and went over to the Conservative Party. He was again elected mayor of Sola in 1999, serving until 2011.

References

1955 births
Living people
People from Sola, Norway
Conservative Party (Norway) politicians
Progress Party (Norway) politicians
Mayors of places in Rogaland